Josef Deimer  (born 1936 in Landshut] is a German politician, representative of the Christian Social Union of Bavaria. Between 1982 and 2000 he was a member of the Bavarian Senate. He was the mayor of Landshut 1970–2004.

See also
List of Bavarian Christian Social Union politicians

References

Christian Social Union in Bavaria politicians
1936 births
Living people
Commanders Crosses of the Order of Merit of the Federal Republic of Germany